Carlos Revilla González (22 January 1933 – 28 September 2000) was a Spanish voice actor and voice director known for his role as Homer Simpson in the Spanish version of The Simpsons, for which he was also the dubbing director.

Biography
Born in Salamanca, Castile and León, Revilla left his medical studies at the age of 20 to become a radio actor on Cadena SER and later moved into dubbing of American films into Spanish. He dubbed the voices of actors such as Walter Matthau, Charlton Heston, Jack Lemmon and Bill Cosby and was the voice of KITT on Knight Rider in Spain. He worked on the dubbing of the first eleven seasons of The Simpsons, directing the entire process in addition to voicing Homer.

Fox Broadcasting Company, original creators of The Simpsons, said that the Spanish dub of the show was the best in Europe.

Death
Revilla died of a heart attack in Madrid on 28 September 2000 at the age of 67. The Spanish voice of Homer Simpson was passed on to Carlos Ysbert, who continues nowadays with the role.

References

External links
 
Acting filmography 
Directing filmography 

1933 births
2000 deaths
Male actors from Castile and León
People from Salamanca
Spanish male voice actors
Spanish voice directors
20th-century Spanish male actors